The Plovdiv derby is the derby in Bulgarian football between Botev Plovdiv and Lokomotiv Plovdiv. It is named after the city, where both clubs are located. The Plovdiv derby is considered to be the second fiercest rivalry in Bulgarian football, after the Eternal derby of Bulgarian football. The first match between Botev and Lokomotiv was held on 1 April 1951. Since then, it has been played almost regularly twice per season. Overall, Botev have more wins, having won 47 games, Lokomotiv have won 45, and 35 games ended in a draw.

Overview 
Plovdiv derby is the name given to a football match played between two Plovdiv clubs. Although the name is mostly used to describe the match between the city's two most successful clubs, Botev and Lokomotiv, there is another derby match known as The small Plovdiv derby, contested between Spartak and Maritsa.

League matches (1948–49 – present)

Bulgarian Cup and other

Overall match statistics

Head-to-head ranking in First League (1948–2022) 

• Total: Botev Plovdiv with 43 higher finishes, Lokomotiv Plovdiv with 31 higher finishes (as of the end of the 2021–22 season).

Trophies 

Notes:
 Bulgarian Cup section includes Soviet Army Cup as major Cup tournament.
 Soviet Army Cup section includes the period after 1982 as secondary Cup tournament.
 Italics indicates defunct tournaments.

References

External links 
Bulgaria Cups Overview – Bulgarian Cups, RSSSF.com

Football derbies in Bulgaria
Botev Plovdiv
PFC Lokomotiv Plovdiv
1951 establishments in Bulgaria